Podalyria argentea is a species of flowering plant in the legume family (Fabaceae or Leguminosae), native to the Cape Province of South Africa.

It should not be confused with Podalyria argentea Willd., which is a synonym for a quite different species, Ammodendron bifolium, from Russia and Xinjiang, China.

References

Podalyrieae
Endemic flora of South Africa
Flora of the Cape Provinces
Fynbos
Plants described in 1806